Green Shutters, on Franklin St. in Tangipahoa, Louisiana, was built around 1850.  It includes Greek Revival style.  It was listed on the National Register of Historic Places in 1982.

It is the only known raised Greek Revival cottage in Tangipahoa Parish.

It is said that Confederate soldiers from Camp Moore recuperated here;  it was bought in 1900 by family physician Dr. John W. Lambert, who lived in the house until his death in 1931.

References

Greek Revival architecture in Louisiana
National Register of Historic Places in Tangipahoa Parish, Louisiana
Buildings and structures completed in 1850